Polygrammodes compositalis is a moth in the family Crambidae. It was described by Julius Lederer in 1863. It is found in Rio de Janeiro, Brazil.

References

Spilomelinae
Moths described in 1863
Moths of South America